Aotus ericoides, also known as common aotus or golden pea, is a shrub in the family Fabaceae. It flowers in leaf axils in spring and has yellow pea flowers with splotches of red. It is endemic to eastern Australia.

Description
The stems are often covered in short, matted, rusty or greyish coloured hairs. The leaves are whorls of 3 or more either growing alternate or opposite. The leaf edge may be curved backwards or rolled under. The leaf upper surface has either small wart-like protuberances or smooth with occasional long hairs. The single yellow pea flower has a red-orange band around a yellow centre and bright yellow wings and keel. The seed capsule is a swollen firm, egg-shaped pod and covered with long soft hairs. Flowering occurs late winter to spring in upper leaf axils.

Taxonomy and naming
Common aotus  was first formally described in 1803 by Étienne Pierre Ventenat who gave it the name Pultanaea ericoides  and the description was published in Jardin de la Malmaison. In 1832 the Scottish botanist George Don changed the name to Aotus ericoides  and the description was published in A General History of Dichlamydeous Plants.  The specific epithet (ericoides) refers to the similarity to a species of Erica. The suffix - oides is a Latin ending meaning "likeness".

Distribution and habitat
It occurs in heathland and dry sclerophyll forests on sandstone in Queensland, South Australia, Victoria and Tasmania. In New South Wales it is found on the coast and Southern Highlands.

References

Mirbelioids
Flora of New South Wales
Flora of Queensland
Flora of Victoria (Australia)
Flora of Tasmania
Fabales of Australia